The 2014–15 FIU Panthers men's basketball team represented Florida International University during the 2014–15 NCAA Division I men's basketball season. The Panthers, led by second year head coach Anthony Evans, played their home games at FIU Arena, and were members of Conference USA. They finished the season 16–17, 8–10 in C-USA play in a 4-way tie for seventh place. They advanced to the quarterfinals of the C-USA tournament where they lost to UTEP.

Previous season 
The Panthers finished the season 15–16, 7–9 in C-USA play to finish in a three-way tie for eighth place. Due to APR penalties, they were ineligible for a post-season berth, including the 2014 Conference USA men's basketball tournament.

Departures

Incoming Transfers

Recruiting class of 2014

Roster

Schedule

|-
!colspan=9 style="background:#002D62; color:#C5960C;"| Regular season

|-
!colspan=9 style="background:#002D62; color:#C5960C;"| Conference USA tournament

References

FIU Panthers men's basketball seasons
Florida International
FIU Panthers men's b
FIU Panthers men's b